Susan Elizabeth Miller, Baroness Miller of Chilthorne Domer (born 1 January 1954) is a Liberal Democrat member of the House of Lords.

She married firstly John Miller and secondly Humphrey Temperley, both of whom were active in political life as Liberal Democrats. By her first marriage she had two daughters, but one is deceased, and also has three stepchildren by her second marriage.

Miller worked in publishing. She served as a councillor at parish, district and county levels from 1987 to 2005, leading South Somerset District Council and as a member of Somerset County Council. She was made a Life Peer as Baroness Miller of Chilthorne Domer, of Chilthorne Domer in the County of Somerset on 28 July 1998.

She was the Liberal Democrat spokesperson in the Lords on Agriculture and Rural Affairs 1999–2001, Environment, Food and Rural Affairs 2001–07 and Home Affairs 2007–09. She now chairs the All Party Groups on Agroecology and Food and Health. She is a co-president of Parliamentarians for Nuclear Non Proliferation and Disarmament. When not in Parliament she works on the family vineyard.

References

External links
Baroness Miller of Chilthorne Domer profile at the Liberal Democrats site
Announcement of her introduction at the House of Lords, 6 October 1998

1954 births
Living people
Life peeresses created by Elizabeth II
Miller of Chiltorne Domer, Susan Miller, Baroness
Liberal Democrats (UK) councillors
Members of Somerset County Council
Councillors in Somerset
Leaders of local authorities of England
Women councillors in England